Extraordinarius is a genus of South American huntsman spiders. It was first described by C. A. Rheims in 2019, and it has only been found in Brazil.

Species
 it contains four species:
E. andrematosi Rheims, 2019 (type) – Brazil
E. brucedickinsoni Rheims, 2019 – Brazil
E. klausmeinei Rheims, 2019 – Brazil
E. rickalleni Rheims, 2019 – Brazil

See also
 List of Sparassidae species

References

Sparassidae genera
Spiders of Brazil